Asgeir Mandelid Årdal (born 30 November 1983) is a Norwegian cross-country skier.  He made his FIS Cross-Country World Cup debut in March 2005 in Drammen, Norway.  He collected his first World Cup points with a 24th place finish in Drammen in March 2008.

Årdal represents the sports club Jølster IL, in Jølster, Sogn og Fjordane. He currently lives in the village of Skei in Jølster municipality.

Cross-country skiing results
All results are sourced from the International Ski Federation (FIS).

World Cup

Season standings

References

1983 births
Living people
Norwegian male cross-country skiers
People from Sogn og Fjordane
People from Jølster
Sportspeople from Vestland